New Castle Correctional Facility is a privately run (but state-owned) prison located in New Castle, Indiana, United States. It opened in 2002. In September 2005, the state signed a contract with the for-profit GEO Group, Inc. of Boca Raton, Florida, to run the prison. The facility is rated as minimum- to medium-security, but also has a maximum-security psychiatric unit and annex. It is currently the second-largest prison in Indiana, and can hold approximately 3,270 inmates.

Riot of April 24, 2007
On Tuesday, April 24, 2007, it was about noon when a disturbance in the prison dining hall occurred. A little after 2:00 p.m., the local New Castle police department responded en masse, as did forces from the Henry County Fire Department and Sheriff's Department. Sheriff's Deputies from adjacent Delaware County, along with elements of the Indiana State Police also responded.

Reportedly, it started with a cluster of Arizona prisoners transported there against their will consequent to a memorandum of understanding with the state of Arizona and GEO Group. They refused to wear state-issued smocks over T-shirts as a display of non-compliance during the midday meal. This is when Captain Deaton stepped in and tried to handcuff several offenders and was severely beaten by three inmates.

These prisoners were reportedly picked for being non-violent and generally getting along with the rules; it is suggested the Arizona convicts felt they were, in effect, being punished for obeying the rules, and had they been less compliant back in Arizona, they would have remained there. An earlier deal with California fell through when that state was unable to come up with enough non-violent prisoners willing to volunteer for the transfer; the Arizona convicts were transferred on a non-voluntary basis.

This was not the first time Arizona transportees had been involved in prison disturbances in other states.

Two news helicopters from regional NBC and CBS affiliates provided live images carried on MSNBC's WTHR, and Fox News. Piles of burning debris and smoke plumes were evident, reportedly mattresses, combustible furniture and garbage.

Within two hours, full order and authority was restored, though some inmates continued to be audibly angry for some time afterwards. Shortly after 3:30 p.m., J. David Donahue, then the Commissioner of the Indiana Department of Correction, reported that conditions were returning to normal.

Two correctional officers were reported to have received very slight injuries. Seven prisoners were treated for minor injuries at the prison.

The state suspended the transfer of additional Arizona inmates pending an investigation. Governor Mitch Daniels said the transportees directly involved in the disturbance would be returned to Arizona.

Aftermath
The DOC moved 69 Arizona transportees to the Reception Diagnostic Center in Plainfield, Indiana where they were placed in segregation the night of the riot.

A month after the riot, a "post-event analysis" was released by the Indiana Department of Corrections. This report states

Sources
Post event analysis by Indiana DOC (*.pdf), Retrieved 24 May 2007
Indianapolis Star article, 24 May 2007
Indiana DOC press release
Fort Wayne News-Sentinel DEAD LINK 
Indiana State Police response (WTHR/MSNBC)
CNN story
Geo Group Inc
nbcnews.com story
PCI (anti-private corrections site)

References

External links
New Castle Correctional Facility official web site

2007 riots
Prisons in Indiana
Private prisons in the United States
Riots and civil disorder in Indiana
Buildings and structures in Henry County, Indiana
Prison uprisings in the United States
GEO Group
2002 establishments in Indiana